The San Luis Gonzaga Archeological District is an archaeological historic district located within the San Luis Reservoir State Recreation Area in the eastern Diablo Range, in Merced County, California.

It is near Los Banos and the western edge of the San Joaquin Valley.

Description
The district includes five midden deposits which indicate the location of prehistoric villages.

The site of the village of Hahnomah, which was inhabited by the Kahwatchwah Yokuts, is also located in the district.

The district was added to the National Register of Historic Places on May 7, 1973.

References

Yokuts
Archaeological sites on the National Register of Historic Places in California
Diablo Range
History of Merced County, California
History of the San Joaquin Valley
Los Banos, California
Historic districts on the National Register of Historic Places in California
National Register of Historic Places in Merced County, California